Matthew or Matt Elliott may refer to:

 Matthew Elliott (cricketer) (born 1971), Australian Test cricketer
 Matthew Elliott (loyalist) (1739–1814), British agent in the American Revolution and War of 1812
 Matthew Elliott (political strategist) (born 1978), British political strategist and lobbyist
 Matthew Elliott (rugby league) (born 1964), Australian rugby league footballer and coach
 Matt Elliott (American football) (born 1968), American football player
 Matt Elliott (footballer) (born 1968), retired Scottish international footballer
 Matt Elliott (musician), founder of The Third Eye Foundation
 Matt Elliott (writer) (born 1969), New Zealand author